was a Japanese banker, businessman, investor, and politician. He served as the 4th Governor of the Bank of Japan (BOJ). He was created a Baron in 1900; and he was a member of Japan's House of Peers.

Early life
Iwasaki was born in Kōchi Prefecture. He was the brother of Iwasaki Yatarō, the founder of Mitsubishi.

He was educated at the Tokyo Imperial University and at the University of Pennsylvania in Phlladelphia.

Career
In 1885, Iwasaki became the second president of Mitsubishi.

Iwasaki was Governor of the Bank of Japan from November 11, 1896—October 20, 1898.

In 1890, he was responsible for Mitsubishi's purchase of the land in most of the central business district in Tokyo when it was still covered with grass and bamboo.

Legacy
Iwasaki's son Koyata would become Mitsubishi's 4th president; and his second son Toshiya would found his own company, Asahi Glass.

Notes

References
 Weston, Mark. (1999). Giants of Japan: the Lives of Japan's Greatest Men and Women. New York : Kodansha International. ; OCLC 246601936

1851 births
1908 deaths
19th-century Japanese businesspeople
Governors of the Bank of Japan
Japanese art collectors
Japanese bankers
Japanese chief executives
Japanese investors
People from Kōchi Prefecture
University of Tokyo alumni
Wharton School of the University of Pennsylvania alumni